The Birth of Alternative Vol. 1 is a compilation album released in 1998, from Rhino's Flashback Records.

Track listing 
"Blew" by Nirvana (from Bleach)
"Love or Confusion" by Screaming Trees (from Sub Pop 200)
"Indian Summer" by Beat Happening (from Jamboree)
"Truly" by Hazel (from Toreador of Love)
"Turn on the Water" by The Afghan Whigs (from Congregation)
"You Got It" by Mudhoney (from Mudhoney)
"Where Did You Sleep Last Night?" by Mark Lanegan (from The Winding Sheet)
"Ritual Device" by Tad (from God's Balls)
"Love Buzz" by Nirvana (from Blew (EP)'')
"Dicknail" by Hole

References

2003 compilation albums
Alternative rock compilation albums
Grunge compilation albums